Sphingobacterium alimentarium is a Gram-negative and rod-shaped bacterium from the genus of Sphingobacterium which has been isolated from a dairy environment in Germany.

References

External links 
Type strain of Sphingobacterium alimentarium at BacDive -  the Bacterial Diversity Metadatabase

Sphingobacteriia
Bacteria described in 2012